The Dey Road Bridge is a historic truss bridge that spans the Tiffin River near the city of Defiance, Ohio, United States.  Built in the 1900s, it has been designated a historic site.

In 1835, an early toll bridge across the Tiffin was built at the nearby community of Brunersburg, but it was soon destroyed by a flood.  The current bridge is a Pratt through truss bridge that was manufactured by the Massillon Bridge Company and built in 1906.  Built on concrete supports, it is constructed primarily of iron.  In 1907, it became a local landmark for surveying purposes when a USGS surveyor placed a benchmark on its northwestern abutment.

In 1999, the bridge was listed on the National Register of Historic Places, qualifying because of its historically significant engineering.  By that time, the bridge was vacant and not in use.  Now known as the "Old Dey Bridge", the bridge is closed to road traffic, although pedestrians are still permitted to use it.  The bridge is one of several locations included as points of interest on a proposed Defiance city strategic plan.

References

External links

Bridges completed in 1906
Buildings and structures in Defiance County, Ohio
National Register of Historic Places in Defiance County, Ohio
Road bridges on the National Register of Historic Places in Ohio
Pedestrian bridges in Ohio
Former road bridges in the United States
Pratt truss bridges in the United States
Iron bridges in the United States
1906 establishments in Ohio
Defiance, Ohio